Raju Kumar Singh is an Indian politician from Bihar and a Member of the Bihar Legislative Assembly. Singh won the Sahebganj Assembly constituency on the VIP ticket in the 2020 Bihar Legislative Assembly election. He recently defected from Vikassheel Insaan Party with the other two MLAs of the VIP and joined BJP. Raju Singh started his career in politics with Lok Jansakti Party.

Criminal Records 

There are more than 10 criminal cases lodged against him, including of Arms Act and murder. He is also alleged to be involved in the murder of a woman architect, named Archana Gupta, during New Year's celebration in his Delhi's farmhouse.

According to The Indian Express "Police said that prima facie investigation revealed that former MLA Raju Singh, accused in the shooting, was drunk when he allegedly took out the pistol to shoot in the air, as many in the gathering were dancing."

Political career

References

Living people
Bihar MLAs 2020–2025
Vikassheel Insaan Party politicians
Janata Dal (United) politicians
1970 births
Bharatiya Janata Party politicians from Bihar
Lok Janshakti Party politicians